Pimpama railway station is a planned railway station on the Gold Coast Line in Queensland, Australia. It  will serve the Gold Coast suburb of Pimpama, and will be located between Ormeau and Coomera stations.

History 

In November 2017, the Queensland Government committed to building three new in-fill stations on the Gold Coast Line as part of the AU$5.4 billion Cross River Rail project—Pimpama, Helensvale North and Merrimac. Pimpama station will be built to accommodate the rapidly growing population in the region, in order to alleviate the pressure on the nearby Ormeau and Coomera stations. The station is expected to cost up to $40 million to construct, and is planned to be open by 2024, in time for the commencement of services on the new Cross River Rail line.

The planned location for Pimpama station is off the Old Pacific Highway, near the Pimpama City Shopping Centre. The station will be integrated with other modes of public transport, and is planned to feature connections with pedestrian and bicycle paths. The station concept design currently includes space for 330 car park bays.

Early work and site preparation activities had begun by January 2023. 40,000 cubic metres of spoil will have to be excavated. ADCO Constructions will design and construct the station.

References

External links 

Railway stations in Gold Coast City
Proposed railway stations in Australia
Pimpama, Queensland

Railway stations scheduled to open in 2024